The Attorney General Alliance (AGA) is a nonprofit group of state attorneys general in the United States. The AGA was founded in 1982 as a bipartisan group of state attorneys general. The group's current chairman is Democrat Phil Weiser, who is the Colorado Attorney General. The majority of the AGA's funding comes from corporate sponsorships, including from companies that state attorneys general are tasked with investigating. The group has faced criticism for its fundraising practices, including "courting sponsorships for lavish conferences and foreign junkets from a stable of lobbyists and corporate patrons."

History and overview
The group was founded in 1982 as the Conference of Western Attorneys General (CWAG), a bipartisan group of 15 western states and three territories. By 2019, the group included attorneys general from 46 states. The group's current chairman is Phil Weiser, a Democrat who is the Colorado Attorney General. The AGA's policy issues and initiatives include cannabis regulation, sports betting, cybercrime, and social justice and equity.

Corporate sponsors and fundraising practices

The majority of the AGA's revenue comes from corporate sponsorships. Some of those corporate sponsors are companies that state attorneys general are tasked with investigating. Attendance at AGA meetings requires a minimum donation of $10,000 to the group. Sponsors of the AGA's 2022 annual meeting included Meta Platforms, Amazon, TikTok, Target Corporation, and the Center for Secure and Modern Elections, a project of the left-leaning Arabella Advisors network. The Center for Secure and Modern Elections is affiliated with the Center for Tech and Civic Life, which received $350 million from Mark Zuckerberg in 2020 for local government election administration. Major sponsors of AGA's 2019 conference included Juul, AWL Inc., Quicken Loans, Pfizer, Comcast, and AT&T, companies which at the time were all facing class action lawsuits brought by state attorneys general. Major U.S. plaintiffs' law firms have also sponsored AGA events.

The AGA has drawn criticism for "courting sponsorships for lavish conferences and foreign junkets from a stable of lobbyists and corporate patrons," according to Axios. In a June 2022 resignation letter, Chris Toth, the former executive director of competitor group the National Association of Attorneys General, alleged that the AGA was selling access to lobbyists and corporate patrons. Toth wrote that he was "increasingly alarmed at the growing influence of lobbyist and corporate money in the attorney general arena, particularly involving entities that are being investigated and/or sued by AGs." Toth sent his resignation letter to all state attorneys general and chief deputies. He alleged that the AGA was "a vessel for lobbying and a threat to the ethics of state attorneys general."

The AGA sponsors junkets to foreign countries including Qatar and Morocco. It is "known to wine and dine state officials and their staffers."

See also
 National Association of Attorneys General

References

External links
 

State attorneys general in the United States
Government-related professional associations in the United States